Edith Horle (January 10, 1897 – May 23, 1962) was an American painter. Her work was part of the painting event in the art competition at the 1932 Summer Olympics.

References

1897 births
1962 deaths
20th-century American painters
American women painters
Olympic competitors in art competitions
People from Syracuse, New York
20th-century American women artists